Teresė Nekrošaitė (born October 19, 1961 in Bitvanas, Kaunas) is a retired female javelin thrower from Lithuania. She represented her native country at the 1992 Summer Olympics, finishing in 18th place in the final rankings. She set her personal best (67.68 metres) in 1992 with the old javelin type.

Achievements

References

  sports-reference

1961 births
Living people
Lithuanian female javelin throwers
Athletes (track and field) at the 1992 Summer Olympics
Olympic athletes of Lithuania
Sportspeople from Kaunas